Richard Spielman (born December 2, 1962) is an American football executive who was most recently the general manager of the Minnesota Vikings of the National Football League (NFL) from 2012 to 2022.  He was promoted to general manager in 2012 after spending 2006–2011 as the team's vice president of player personnel. He formerly worked for ESPN on NFL Live.

Spielman is a graduate of Massillon Washington High School located in Massillon, Ohio and is the older brother of Chris Spielman, former Detroit Lions and Buffalo Bills linebacker.

Playing career
Spielman played linebacker at Southern Illinois University (1983–86), earning first-team All-Gateway Conference honoree as a junior. He was also part of the 1983 NCAA Division I-AA national championship team as a redshirt freshman. Upon entering the NFL, as an undrafted free agent, he was invited to training camp with the San Diego Chargers (1987) and Detroit Lions (1988), but did not make it as a professional football player.

Executive career

Early career
Spielman began his NFL career as a scout with Detroit in 1990 and worked with the club in college scouting for five seasons before adding pro scouting duties in 1995 and 1996. He moved to Director of Pro Personnel for the Bears from 1997 to 1999 before joining the Dolphins in 2000 as Vice President of Player Personnel. He was promoted in 2002 to Senior Vice President-Football Operations/Player Personnel and eventually General Manager in 2004. Spielman left the Dolphins during the 2005 off-season.

Spielman worked with ESPN as an NFL analyst in 2005, before joining the Minnesota Vikings.

Minnesota Vikings
Spielman assumed the Vikings' Vice President of Player Personnel role on May 30, 2006, replacing Fran Foley. On January 3, 2012, Spielman was promoted to General Manager of the Vikings.

Spielman oversaw fifteen drafts in Minnesota. His most notable draftees include: Adrian Peterson and Sidney Rice in 2007; Letroy Guion and John Sullivan in 2008; Percy Harvin and Phil Loadholt in 2009; Chris Cook and Toby Gerhart in 2010; Christian Ponder and Kyle Rudolph in 2011; Matt Kalil, Harrison Smith and Blair Walsh in 2012; Xavier Rhodes, and Cordarrelle Patterson in 2013; and, Teddy Bridgewater and Anthony Barr in 2014.  Prior to 2012 when he was promoted to General Manager, Spielman shared a "triangle of authority" in drafts with Vikings' owner Zygi Wilf and then-head coach Brad Childress.

In 2014 Spielman was given the authority to make a head coaching change. He hired Mike Zimmer to replace Leslie Frazier. Mike Zimmer and new offensive coordinator Norv Turner were involved in the draft process in 2014 and 2015. Notable 2015 draft picks on defense included Eric Kendricks who led the Vikings in tackles, Danielle Hunter who recorded 6 sacks in limited playing time and saw his role grow towards the end of the year. The Vikings also drafted star wide receiver Stefon Diggs (led the team in receiving yards as he recorded 720 yards and 4 touchdowns on 14 games)

The draft aside, Spielman is best known for several key offseason moves. In 2012 Spielman helped the team sign fullback Jerome Felton who made it to the Pro Bowl that same year and who was a major contributor to Adrian Peterson rushing for the second-highest amount of rushing yards in a season in NFL history. In 2015, the Vikings brought in Terence Newman and traded for Mike Wallace. In 2018, the Vikings signed free agent QB Kirk Cousins to a 3-year contract. Under Rick Spielman, the Vikings have also hit on undrafted players like Andrew Sendejo, Marcus Sherels, Adam Thielen and Anthony Harris.

In August 2020, Spielman signed a multiyear extension with the Vikings that runs through 2023.

On January 10, 2022, Spielman was fired by the Vikings after 16 years with the team.

Personal life
Spielman is married and has six adopted children. Ronnie played lacrosse at Ohio State University.

References

1962 births
Living people
Southern Illinois Salukis football players
Miami Dolphins executives
Minnesota Vikings executives
National Football League general managers
Sportspeople from Massillon, Ohio